is a regional radio and television broadcaster headquartered in Naha, Okinawa, Japan that serves Okinawa Prefecture. It commenced radio broadcast in October 1954 and television in June 1960.

History

Okinawa under US rule 
On May 16, 1949, the radio station Voice of Ryukyus was founded by the U.S. military government in the Ryukyu Islands for a trial broadcast under the call sign AKAR, and officially started broadcasting on January 21, 1950, as the first Japanese language broadcast by the U.S. military government to the Ryukyu people, with 75% of the programs broadcast by NHK and 25% by the U.S. Military Government. On February 1, 1953, its call sign changed to KSAR, alongside the increase of the broadcaster's transmitting power. On April 1, 1954, the radio station was handed over to the University of Ryukyu Foundation owing to a shift in the broadcasting industry in the United States, which had an impact on Okinawa as well.

Due to financial problems of the said university's foundation, Ryukyu Broadcasting was established on September 20, 1954 with a capital of ¥10 million to take over the radio operations of the Voice of Ryukyus, with Okinawa Times being the primary owner. Ryukyu Broadcasting officially started broadcasting on October 1, 1954 with the same call sign (KSAR) from its previous owner. An English version of the existing radio station started broadcasting on September 1 of the following year, with the callsign KSBK, primarily aimed for the US military and their families.On July 30, 1958, the broadcaster began a groundbreaking ceremony of the construction of its second generation headquarters, which was completed on May 20 of the following year, and started operations on June 23 of the same year.

On July 24, 1957, the broadcaster applied for a TV broadcasting license, which was later rejected by the prefectural government. Two years later, on April 9, 1959, they applied again for a TV broadcasting license, which was approved and obtained on December 2 of that year. Prior to their start of TV broadcast, they joined Japan News Network. On June 1, 1960, RBC started broadcasting on TV, being the second commercial TV channel in Okinawa. In 1963, the broadcaster started to expand its broadcast coverage with the opening of its relay transmitter in Kume Island, a first in the prefecture.The following year, the first broadcast link between Japan and Okinawa was established, allowing more programs to be simulcast between the two areas.Ryukyu Broadcasting also composed "RBC Song", which was played since 1964 during sign-on and sign-off on both TV and radio until they went 24/7/365 on April 1, 2022.

Network affiliations

Radio
 Japan Radio Network (JRN)

TV
 Japan News Network (JNN)

Note

References

External links
Corporate website 
Radio website 
Television website 

Japan News Network
Television stations in Japan
Mass media in Okinawa Prefecture
Companies based in Okinawa Prefecture
Television channels and stations established in 1960
Mass media in Naha